Cretotortor is an extinct genus of fossil beetles in the family Gyrinidae, containing the following species:

 Cretotortor archarensis Ponomarenko, 1977 Darmakan Formation, Russia, Paleocene (Danian)
 Cretotortor zherichini Ponomarenko, 1973 Kzyl-Zhar, Kazakhstan, Late Cretaceous (Turonian)

References

Gyrinidae
Fossil taxa described in 1973
Adephaga genera
Prehistoric beetle genera